Río de Jesús is a corregimiento in Río de Jesús District, Veraguas Province, Panama with a population of 2,484 in 2010. It is the seat of Río de Jesús District. Its population was 3,602 in 1990 and 2,585 in 2000.

References

Corregimientos of Veraguas Province